Lake Sysmä may refer to:

 Lake Sysmä (Ilomantsi)
 Lake Sysmä (Joroinen)